The Icelandic Chess Championship is usually held in Reykjavík. It is organised by the Icelandic Chess Federation (ICF), the body responsible for holding national chess events and for representing Icelandic chess at the World Chess Federation (FIDE). The ICF was founded in 1925 and its main activities include the national chess championship and the annual 'Reykjavik Open' tournament.

The tournament has always been organized as a round robin with the exception of the 100th anniversary tournament in 2013, which was held as a Swiss-style open tournament.

The current Icelandic chess champion is Hjörvar Steinn Grétarsson (2022).

National championship winners
The list of Icelandic champions before 2013 is taken from the Icelandic Chess Federation website.

{| class="sortable wikitable"
! Year !! Winner
|-
| 1913 || Pétur Zóphóniasson
|-
| 1914 ||Pétur Zóphóniasson
|-
| 1915 ||Pétur Zóphóniasson
|-
| 1916 ||Pétur Zóphóniasson
|-
| 1917 ||Pétur Zóphóniasson
|-
| 1918 || Eggert Gilfer
|-
| 1919 || Stefán Olafsson
|-
| 1920 ||Eggert Gilfer
|-
| 1921 ||Stefán Olafsson
|-
| 1922 ||Stefán Olafsson
|-
| 1923 || Friman Olafsson
|-
| 1924 || Sigurdur Jónsson
|-
| 1925 ||Eggert Gilfer
|-
| 1926 ||Sigurdur Jónsson
|-
| 1927 ||Eggert Gilfer
|-
| 1928 || Einar Thorvaldsson
|-
| 1929 ||Eggert Gilfer
|-
| 1930 || Hannes Hafstein
|-
| 1931 || Ásmundur Ásgeirsson
|-
| 1932 || Jón Guðmundsson
|-
| 1933 ||Ásmundur Ásgeirsson
|-
| 1934 ||Ásmundur Ásgeirsson
|-
| 1935 ||Eggert Gilfer
|-
| 1936 ||Jón Gudmundsson
|-
| 1937 ||Jón Gudmundsson
|-
| 1938 || Baldur Möller
|-
| 1939* ||Baldur Möller
|-
| 1940 ||Einar Thorvaldsson
|-
| 1941 ||Baldur Möller
|-
| 1942 ||Eggert Gilfer
|-
| 1943 ||Baldur Möller
|-
| 1944 ||Ásmundur Ásgeirsson
|-
| 1945 ||Ásmundur Ásgeirsson
|-
| 1946 ||Ásmundur Ásgeirsson
|-
| 1947 ||Baldur Möller
|-
| 1948 ||Baldur Möller
|-
| 1949 || Guðmundur Arnlaugsson
|-
| 1950 ||Baldur Möller
|-
| 1951 ||Lárus Johnsen
|-
| 1952 || Friðrik Ólafsson
|-
| 1953 ||Friðrik Ólafsson
|-
| 1954 || Gudmundur S Gudmundsson
|-
| 1955* ||Gudmundur S Gudmundsson
|-
| 1956 || Ingi Randver Jóhannsson
|-
| 1957 ||Friðrik Ólafsson
|-
| 1958 ||Ingi Randver Jóhannsson
|-
| 1959 ||Ingi Randver Jóhannsson
|-
| 1960 || Freysteinn Thorbergsson
|-
| 1961 ||Friðrik Ólafsson
|-
| 1962 ||Friðrik Ólafsson
|-
| 1963 ||Ingi Randver Jóhannsson
|-
| 1964 ||Helgi Ólafsson sr.
|-
| 1965 || Guðmundur Sigurjónsson
|-
| 1966 ||Gunnar Kristinn Gunnarsson
|-
| 1967 ||Björn Thorsteinsson
|-
| 1968 ||Guðmundur Sigurjónsson
|-
| 1969 ||Friðrik Ólafsson
|-
| 1970 ||Olafur Magnússon
|-
| 1971 || Jón Kristinsson
|-
| 1972 ||Guðmundur Sigurjónsson
|-
| 1973 ||Olafur Magnússon
|-
| 1974 || Jón Kristinsson
|-
| 1975 ||Björn Thorsteinsson
|-
| 1976 || Haukur Angantýsson
|-
| 1977 || Jón Arnason
|-
| 1978 || Helgi Ólafsson
|-
| 1979 ||Ingvar Ásmundsson
|-
| 1980 || Jóhann Hjartarson
|-
| 1981 ||Helgi Ólafsson
|-
| 1982 || Jón Arnason
|-
| 1983 ||Hilmar Karlsson
|-
| 1984 ||Jóhann Hjartarson
|-
| 1985 || Karl Thorsteins
|-
| 1986 || Margeir Pétursson
|-
| 1987 ||Margeir Pétursson
|-
| 1988 || Jón Arnason
|-
| 1989 ||Karl Thorsteins
|-
| 1990 || Héðinn Steingrímsson
|-
| 1991 ||Helgi Ólafsson
|-
| 1992 ||Helgi Ólafsson
|-
| 1993 ||Helgi Ólafsson
|-
| 1994 ||Jóhann Hjartarson
|-
| 1995 ||Jóhann Hjartarson
|-
| 1996 ||Helgi Ólafsson
|-
| 1997 ||Jóhann Hjartarson
|-
| 1998 || Hannes Stefánsson
|-
| 1999 ||Hannes Stefánsson
|-
| 2000 ||Jón Viktor Gunnarsson
|-
| 2001 ||Hannes Stefánsson
|-
| 2002 ||Hannes Stefánsson
|-
| 2003 ||Hannes Stefánsson
|-
| 2004 ||Hannes Stefánsson
|-
| 2005 ||Hannes Stefánsson
|-
| 2006 ||Hannes Stefánsson
|-
| 2007 ||Hannes Stefánsson
|-
| 2008 ||Hannes Stefánsson
|-
| 2009 || Henrik Danielsen
|-
| 2010 ||Hannes Stefánsson
|-
| 2011 ||Héðinn Steingrímsson
|-
| 2012 || Thröstur Thórhallsson
|-
| 2013 ||Hannes Stefánsson
|-
| 2014 || Guðmundur Kjartansson
|-
| 2015 ||Héðinn Steingrímsson
|-
| 2016 || Jóhann Hjartarson
|-
| 2017 || Guðmundur Kjartansson
|-
| 2018 || Helgi Áss Grétarsson
|-
| 2019 ||Hannes Stefánsson
|-
|2020
|Guðmundur Kjartansson
|-
|2021
|Hjörvar Steinn Grétarsson
|-
|2022
|Hjörvar Steinn Grétarsson
|}
Note – no contest was held on the years denoted *. The incumbent champion therefore retained his title.

Women's championship winners
The list of women's champions before 2013 is taken from the Icelandic Chess Federation website.

{| class="sortable wikitable"
! Year !! Winner
|-
| 1975|| Guðlaug Torsteinsdóttir
|-
| 1976|| Birna Norðdahl
|-
| 1977|| Ólöf Tráinsdóttir
|-
| 1978|| Ólöf Tráinsdóttir
|-
| 1979|| Áslaug Kristinsdóttir
|-
| 1980|| Birna Norðdahl
|-
| 1981|| Sigurlaug Friðþjófsdóttir
|-
| 1982|| Guðlaug Torsteinsdóttir
|-
| 1983|| Áslaug Kristinsdóttir
|-
| 1984|| Ólöf Tráinsdóttir
|-
| 1985||Guðfrídur Lilja Gretarsdóttir
|-
| 1986||Guðfrídur Lilja Gretarsdóttir
|-
| 1987||Guðfrídur Lilja Gretarsdóttir
|-
| 1988||Guðfrídur Lilja Gretarsdóttir
|-
| 1989||Guðlaug Torsteinsdóttir
|-
| 1990||Guðfrídur Lilja Gretarsdóttir
|-
| 1991||Guðfrídur Lilja Gretarsdóttir
|-
| 1992||Guðfrídur Lilja Gretarsdóttir
|-
| 1993||Guðfrídur Lilja Gretarsdóttir
|-
| 1994||Áslaug Kristinsdóttir
|-
| 1995|| Ína Björg Árnadóttir
|-
| 1996|| Anna Björg Þorgrímsdóttir
|-
| 1997||Guðfrídur Lilja Gretarsdóttir
|-
| 1998|| Ingibjörg Edda Birgisdóttir
|-
| 1999||Ingibjörg Edda Birgisdóttir
|-
| 2000|| Harpa Ingólfsdóttir
|-
| 2001||Guðfrídur Lilja Gretarsdóttir
|-
| 2002||Guðlaug Torsteinsdóttir
|-
| 2003||Guðfrídur Lilja Gretarsdóttir
|-
| 2004||Harpa Ingólfsdóttir
|-
| 2005||Guðlaug Torsteinsdóttir
|-
| 2006|| Lenka Ptáčníková
|-
| 2007||Guðlaug Torsteinsdóttir
|-
| 2008|| Hallgerður Helga Þorsteinsdóttir
|-
| 2009||Lenka Ptáčníková
|-
| 2010||Lenka Ptáčníková
|-
| 2011|| Elsa María Kristínardóttir
|-
| 2012||Lenka Ptáčníková
|-
| 2013||Lenka Ptáčníková
|-
| 2014||Lenka Ptáčníková
|-
| 2015||Lenka Ptáčníková
|-
| 2016||Lenka Ptáčníková
|-
| 2017||Lenka Ptáčníková
|-
| 2018||Lenka Ptáčníková
|-
| 2019||Lenka Ptáčníková
|-
| 2020||Lenka Ptáčníková
|-
| 2021||Lenka Ptáčníková
|-
| 2022||Lenka Ptáčníková
|}

Notes

References
 (results through 1984)

Icelandic Championships 2006 Masters

Chess national championships
Women's chess national championships
Chess in Iceland
Chess